Since their first game in 1914, the Brazil national football team have played numerous matches against opposition whose identity did not fall within that of the standard FIFA international team. As Brazil are one of the most high-profile teams in the world, with a long-held reputation of skilled players and exciting matches, they are often sought to play in exhibition matches for commercial reasons (see Brasil Global Tour), by clubs/regional federations celebrating anniversaries or by special select teams such as the World XI. Additionally, Brazil's many participations in official tournaments, primarily the FIFA World Cup, have occasionally involved warm-up matches against local non-international opponents.

Limited recognization matches against FIFA members 

Key

Protesting against an Argentine newspaper that published an picture of the Brazilian team drawn as monkeys, some players refused to play and the Brazilian team started the match with only seven Brazilian players and completed by four Argentine players (Baigorri, Antonio Rosado, Emilio Solari and Castro). The crowd protested against the Argentine reinforces in Brazilian team and the match was finally realized with only seven players in each team. 

The São Paulo state football team officially represented Brazil national team in this match.  

Bulgaria was represented in this match by a "B" team and due to this the Bulgarian Football Union don't consider this match as official.

The Football Association of Ireland does not recognize this game as it only used players who played in their local league. 

Swedish FA don't consider this match as official because considers it was played by the olympic team of Sweden.

The Romanian FF don't consider this match as official. According to Romanian FF, this match was played by their "B" team.

The Romanian FF don't consider this match as official. According to Romanian FF, this match was played by their "B" team.

Although many sources (including the Croatian HNS) consider this match as played by the olympic teams, CBF consider it as played by the Brazilian "A" Team.

Although many sources (including the Polish FA) consider this match as played by the olympic teams, CBF consider it as played by the Brazilian "A" Team.

Friendly in celebration of the 45th anniversary of the foundation of Kuwait SC. Kuwait SC officially represented Kuwait national team in this game.

Non-FIFA teams and clubs

20th century
Key

Pre World War II

Post World War II

21st century

References

External links
Arquivo da Seleção Brasileira Principal (Archive of the Brazilian National Team), RSSSF (in Portuguese) 

unofficial
Brazil
National team results